The Special Troops Command (Pol.: Wojska Specjalne) is the special forces command of the Armed Forces of the Republic of Poland (SZ RP). The command was formed in 2007 and is the fourth military branch of the SZ RP.

Composition
The Special Troops Command (Dowództwo Wojsk Specjalnych) is based in Kraków and comprises:
 Jednostka Wojskowa GROM, or GROM, based in Warszawa and Gdańsk 
 Jednostka Wojskowa Komandosów, or JWK, based in Lubliniec
 Jednostka Wojskowa Formoza, or JW FORMOZA, is based in Gdynia 
 Jednostka Wojskowa Agat, or AGAT, based in Gliwice 
 Jednostka Wojskowa NIL, or NIL, is based in Kraków
 7 Special Operations Aviation Squadron based in Powidz; only operational command it is part of the Air Force.

Structure

GROM - Operational-Maneuver Response Group "Cichociemni" (Silent Unseen)
 Command and Support Staff – in Warsaw
 A Squadron (ZB A) – Land Element located in Warsaw
 B Squadron (ZB B) – Maritime Element located in Gdańsk
 C Squadron (ZB C) – Specialty unknown located in Warsaw
 Logistic and Security Unit - located in Warsaw
JW Komandosów - Army Commandos 
 Command and Security - insignia of the Batalion Zośka from the Polish Home Army
 A Squadron (ZB A)- insignia of the Batalion Miotła from the Polish Home Army and insignia of PSBS
 B Squadron (ZB B)- Combined Operations insignia of the No. 10 (Inter-Allied) Commando unit and its No. 6 Troop (Polish)
 C Squadron (ZB C)- insignia of the Batalion Parasol from the Polish Home Army
 D Squadron (ZB D)- set up in 2016
 Information Support Group
 Special Forces Training Center
JW Formoza -  name comes from the colloquial name of the units base, the post-German torpedo house in Gdynia, called "Formoza". 
Special Operations Squadron - at least six special operations sections and a base unit

JW AGAT - formed on the basis of the Special Branch of the Military Police in Gliwice 
 HQ Staff and Command Group
 "A" Company 
 "B" Company 
 "C" Company 
 Combat Support Team
 Logistics Security Team
 Medical Security Group
JW NIL - Support Unit of Command and Security of Special Forces
HQ Staff
Command Team
Logistics Security Team
Information Support Team
Medical Security Group
7 Special Operations Aviation Squadron - based in Powidz
 HQ staff
 Aerospace Group - equipped with 8 Mi-17, including 4 Mi-17-1W and 4 Sikorsky S-70i all helicopters are to be equipped with M134Gs
 Maintenance Group

Gallery

Equipment

Weaponry

Vehicles

Aircraft

Rank insignia 

Officers

Enlisted

See also
Cichociemni
Grupa Wawelberg

References

External links

Official website of the Wojska Specjalne